Aleem Raza (born 1 April 1970 in Pir Mahal) is a field hockey player and former member of the Pakistan National Hockey Team. He participated in the 1996 Atlanta Olympics as a part of Pakistan's national team. He played 33 matches as a striker for Pakistan and scored 8 goals in his career. In 1995 South Asian Games Pakistan won silver medal in hockey and he was the main striker of Pakistan team. He is currently a member of selection committee at Punjab Hockey Association Pakistan.

References

External links
 
phf.com.pk

Pakistani male field hockey players
1970 births
Living people
Olympic field hockey players of Pakistan
Field hockey players at the 1996 Summer Olympics
Field hockey players from Punjab, Pakistan
South Asian Games silver medalists for Pakistan
South Asian Games medalists in field hockey